The NFL Top 100 Players of 2012 was the second season of the series. It ended with reigning NFL MVP Aaron Rodgers being ranked #1, while Super Bowl MVP Eli Manning was ranked #31.

Episode list

The list

References 

National Football League trophies and awards
National Football League records and achievements
National Football League lists